Friend Club (lit: Friend Drive) is a Thai television show hosted by Jumpol Adulkittiporn (Off), Tawan Vihokratana (Tay) and Weerayut Chansook (Arm). Produced by GMMTV, the show premiered on GMM 25 on 23 May 2020, airing on Saturdays at 9:30 ICT while 10:30 ICT on YouTube and LINE TV.

Background 
A gang of close friends born in the same year, 1991, actors Jumpol Adulkittiporn, Tawan Vihokratana and Weerayut Chansook go on a road trip with friends and enjoy various activities together as they transform every journey into fun.

Hosts 
 Jumpol Adulkittiporn (Off)
 Tawan Vihokratana (Tay)
 Weerayut Chansook (Arm)

Episodes

References

External links 
 Youtube Playlist 
 Friend Drive on GMM 25 website 
 Friend Drive on LINE TV
 GMMTV

GMM 25 original programming
Thai television shows